Navicula aleksandrae is a species of algae in the genus Navicula which is found near the Baltic Sea.

References

aleksandrae
Protists described in 2003
Ochrophyte species